Hayley Michelle Aitken (born 11 April 1986) is an Australian pop singer-songwriter and record  producer who also performs mononymously as Hayley. She had a top 40 hit on the ARIA Singles Chart with her second single, "Kiss Me Quick" (July 2002). Aitken has worked as a songwriter or producer for other artists, and is a prolific producer for many K-pop artists.

Biography 

Hayley Aitken was born in April 1986 in the Victorian rural town of Drouin. In 1997 she recorded a song, "Another Tear", following the death of Princess Diana written and produced by Reno Nicastro and Molly Meldrum.

Aitken's debut single, "That Girl", was released under her first name, Hayley, which reached the ARIA Singles Chart top 100 in July 2001. In the ARIA Report it was described as "a catchy urban pop single and features bonus dance remixes." It appeared on an Australian Promo CD for Britney Spears' single, "Stronger". Aitken was signed with Jive/Zomba.

Her second single, "Kiss Me Quick", under the name Hayley Aitken, peaked at No. 31 on the ARIA Singles Chart in August 2002. It contained a b-side, "If I Was to Say", which she wrote when eleven years old. Carmine Pascuzzi described "Kiss Me Quick", "[Aitken] is a teenager with loads of talent and this is an interesting modern pop song that showcases her talent. There is a distinctive confidence and depth in her performance and she delivers this song very positively."

Aitken's third single, "(I Hate the Way) I Love You", (December 2002), which peaked at No. 55. Also in 2002 she recorded a song for the Undercover Angels soundtrack, "[You Must Be An] Angel" Her proposed debut album, Watching TV, was pushed back several times, due to the sale of Zomba records to BMG Records, in 2003. Aitken signed to BMG records but asked to be released from her contract in 2004 so she could pursue her own direction. After her contract with Jive ended, she was signed by Legit music under a management contract by August 2004.

In 2005 Aitken worked as a songwriter, she co-wrote four tracks on Ricki-Lee Coulter's debut self-titled album (October: "Turn It Up", "Something About You", "Stay with Me" and "Hello". She also provided backing vocals for the latter three tracks. Legit Music stated that she was on their artist roster, however on Aitken's MySpace site, she placed her record label as "none". She was signed to Sony BMG publishing.

In 2007, Aitken, Tamara Jaber (ex-Scandal'us) and Reigan Derry (Australian Idol contestant, 2006) formed an all-girl pop trio, Scarlett Belle, and were signed to US label, Def Jam Recordings. In 2008 they were dropped from the label and shortly after Aitken left the group.

During the 2010s, Aitken has written or co-written material for other artists: September's "White Flag" on Love CPR (February 2011), "I Know You're not Alone" on Diamond Veil (May) by Sweetbox, Julie Bergan's "Fire" (June 2014), "Colours" on Eleven (October 2015) by Tina Arena and "Traffic Lights" (May 2015) on Lena's Crystal Sky. Also in 2015, while working in Swedish-based song writing collective, the Kennel, Aitken co-wrote "I Want Your Love" for Ukrainian-born artist, Eduard Romanyuta. "I Want Your Love" was the Moldovan entry for that year's Eurovision Song Contest. Aitken described her writing, "it has always been my dream to write music for different countries and cultures, so this is really cool."

Discography

Singles

Other work

References

External links
 Listen to an unreleased Hayley Aitken songwriting demo. Track: Player (S.Godden/H.Aitken)
 Myspace profile

1986 births
Living people
Singers from Victoria (Australia)
Australian women pop singers
Scarlett Belle members
21st-century Australian women singers